Virgil Childers (c. 1901 – December 10, 1939) was an American blues musician, who hailed from South Carolina, United States.

Biography
Childers was born in Blacksburg, South Carolina to parents Pick Childers and Sarah Smith, and resided there for the duration of his life. Childers recorded six songs for Bluebird Records in Charlotte, North Carolina, in 1938. The recordings are a variety of blues songs, pop music of the time, and Tin Pan Alley tunes. Childers played in a ragtime style that is reminiscent of a swing band.

On December 10, 1939, Childers was shot and killed while trying to escape from a police officer in Shelby, North Carolina. Childers was buried in Shelby on December 13, 1939.

Recordings 
All recordings were made on January 25, 1938 in Charlotte, North Carolina.
 "Preacher & the Bear"
 "Red River Blues"
 "Somebody Stole My Jane"
 "Travelin' Man"
 "Dago Blues"
 "Who's That Knockin' On My Door"

References

1901 births
1939 deaths
20th-century African-American male singers
Singers from South Carolina
American blues guitarists
American male guitarists
American blues singers
Piedmont blues musicians
20th-century American guitarists
Guitarists from South Carolina
People from Blacksburg, South Carolina
African-American guitarists
African Americans shot dead by law enforcement officers in the United States
Deaths by firearm in North Carolina